The 2023 World Beach Games, officially known as the 2023 ANOC World Beach Games and colloquially as Bali 2023, will be the second edition of the World Beach Games, an international beach and water multi-sport event organized by the Association of National Olympic Committees (ANOC). Originally scheduled for 2021, it was postponed until 2023 due to the effects of the COVID-19 pandemic.

Aquathlon, beach handball, kata, beach soccer, beach tennis, beach volleyball, beach water polo, beach wrestling, kite foil and open water swimming will be the "core sports" of the Games, while an additional four sports have also been added to the programme, totalling 14.

Bali, Indonesia was awarded hosting rights on 10 June 2022; the Games will take place from 5–12 August 2023.

Host selection
Following the Games' postponement to 2023, the bidding process began in August 2021, and ended with the announcement of the hosts in June 2022.

Official bids
:
Indonesia officially became the strongest candidate to host the Games, following an announcement made at the General Assembly of the Association of National Olympic Committees (ANOC) in Crete, Greece, which was held on 24–25 October 2021. However, doubts remained as Indonesia's national anti-doping body was subject to a ban by the World Anti-Doping Agency (WADA), preventing it from being awarded hosting rights to any international multisport event. The ban was subsequently lifted by WADA in February 2022. Ultimately, with the ban expired and Indonesia the only official bid put forward, it was unanimously chosen to be hosts in June 2022. The host city contract was signed in October 2022.

Expressed interest
:
The Hong Kong Olympic Committee considered making a bid to host this edition of the Games as early as 2016 after two failed attempts to bid for the hosting rights of the Asian Games, believing that hosting the beach sports competition to be more financially feasible than the continental games. Sites considered for the venue if Hong Kong was to win the bid included Repulse Bay, Stanley, Southern district, Lantau Island and Big Wave Bay.

 Los Angeles:
In 2019, California Ultimate considered submission for a bid for this edition of the Games in partnership with the Los Angeles Organization of Ultimate Teams.

The Games

Sports
The 2023 World Beach Games will feature 14 disciplines in 14 sports; the programme was finalised in August 2022. All of the events are non-Olympic, i.e., not featured in the current programme for the Summer Olympics, and are gender equal.

On 5 October 2022, it was announced that kitefoil racing would be replaced by wingfoil racing, owing to a review of weather conditions in Bali making a successful competition of the former unlikely.

Numbers in parentheses indicate the number of medal events contested in each separate discipline.

Participating National Olympic Committees (NOCs)
It is expected a similar number of NOCs will participate as did in the previous edition (around 100). After the 2022 Russian invasion of Ukraine, the International Olympic Committee (IOC) recommended all Russian and Belarusian athletes and officials are barred from participating at Olympic-affiliated Games.

References

 
2023 in multi-sport events
2023
Scheduled multi-sport events
International sports competitions hosted by Indonesia
Multi-sport events in Indonesia
2023 in Indonesian sport
Sport in Bali
August 2023 sports events in Asia
21st century in Bali
Sports events postponed due to the COVID-19 pandemic
Sports events affected by the 2022 Russian invasion of Ukraine